Coleophora sarehma is a moth of the family Coleophoridae. It is found on the Canary Islands and in North Africa.

The larvae feed on Herniaria fontanesii. They create a three valved tubular silken case of 7–8 mm, with a mouth angle of about 45°. The case is whitish to yellowish grey with light length lines, and is covered with sand grains. Larvae can be found from winter to April.

References

sarehma
Moths of Africa
Moths described in 1956